Gehrlein is a surname. Notable people with the surname include:

Stephanie Gehrlein (born 1982), German tennis player
William Gehrlein (born 1946), American academic

See also 
Gehrlein GP-1, is an American mid-wing, single seat FAI Standard Class glider
Gehrlein Precursor, is an American high-wing single seat glider